Emanuel Parzen (April 21, 1929 – February 6, 2016) was an American statistician. He worked and published on signal detection theory and time series analysis, where he pioneered the use of kernel density estimation (also known as the Parzen window in his honor). Parzen was the recipient of the 1994 Samuel S. Wilks Memorial Medal of the American Statistical Association.

Biography

Parzen attended Bronx High School of Science. He then matriculated to Harvard, where he earned his undergraduate degree in mathematics in 1949. From there, he went on to Berkeley, earning his master and doctorate degrees in mathematics in 1951 and 1953, respectively. His dissertation, "On Uniform Convergence of Families of Sequences of Random Variables", was written under Michel Loève.

Parzen went directly into academia after graduate school, first serving as a research scientist in the physics department and assistant professor of mathematical statistics at Columbia University. He left there in 1956 for Stanford University, where he stayed for the next 14 years. During this time, he wrote what has become one of the classical texts in probability theory. In 1970, he accepted the chair of the statistics department at SUNY Buffalo and in 1978 moved to his last post as a Distinguished Professor at Texas A&M University.

Parzen died in Boca Raton, Florida on February 6, 2016. His son, Michael Parzen, is a Senior Lecturer of Statistics at Harvard University.

Awards
 Fellow, American Statistical Association
 Fellow, Institute of Mathematical Statistics
 Fellow, American Association for the Advancement of Science
 Samuel S. Wilks Memorial Medal

References

External links
 Emanual Parzen's faculty web page at Texas A&M University
 Samuel S. Wilks Award Citations
 Emanuel and Carol Parzen Prize for Statistical Innovation
 People.fas.harvard.edu

1929 births
2016 deaths
American statisticians
Fellows of the American Statistical Association
Jewish American scientists
Harvard College alumni
Mathematicians from New York (state)
Fellows of the American Association for the Advancement of Science
The Bronx High School of Science alumni
University of California, Berkeley alumni
21st-century American Jews